The Texas Rangers' 2007 season began with the team trying to win an AL West title for the first time since 1999. The Rangers finished in last place in the AL West with a 75-87 won-loss record, 19 games behind the Los Angeles Angels of Anaheim.

Preseason
Manager Buck Showalter was fired with three years remaining on his contract. The Rangers hired former Oakland Athletics third base coach Ron Washington to replace Showalter.
OF Gary Matthews Jr., OF/INF Mark DeRosa, OF Carlos Lee, and RHP Adam Eaton signed with other clubs via free agency.
OF Frank Catalanotto signed a multi-year contract,
RHP Éric Gagné and center fielder Kenny Lofton each signed one-year contracts to close games and play center field, respectively.
OF Sammy Sosa also signed a one-year contract with the team that drafted him in 1985, expected to be the Rangers' right fielder.

The team entered the season with only one spot in the pitching rotation to fill, with Jamey Wright beating out Kameron Loe and Bruce Chen (both of whom moved to bullpen roles). Two other new players won roster spots in spring training, C Chris Stewart and INF Matt Kata.

Regular season

Opening Day Starters

Gerald Laird, C
Mark Teixeira, 1B
Ian Kinsler, 2B
Hank Blalock, 3B
Michael Young, SS
Brad Wilkerson, LF
Kenny Lofton, CF
Sammy Sosa, RF
Frank Catalanotto, DH
Kevin Millwood, RHP

Season summary

April
April saw the club get to a slow start. Several of the club's offensive threats had poor starts, notably Michael Young and Mark Teixeira.  One of the few players who was swinging the bat well was sophomore second baseman Ian Kinsler, who batted .298 and hit 9 home runs, earning him an American League Player of the Week award.

Another concern was the starting rotation. Jamey Wright was moved to the 15-day disabled list on April 12, and hasn't returned to the lineup. Vicente Padilla and newcomer Brandon McCarthy both had rough starts, ending April with 4-loss months.

The team's first home series, a two-game set against the Boston Red Sox on April 6 and 7 set records for the coldest home opener and the coldest game ever played at Rangers Ballpark in Arlington.

May
The month of May was one of the most dismal in the club's history. The Rangers ended the month with a 19–35 record, putting them on a pace for a 105-loss season, which would tie the franchise's previous mark for futility, set in 1973. The team's 20 losses set a record for the most ever in the month of May.

The starting rotation continued to have problems. Both Kevin Millwood and McCarthy spent time on the disabled list. Even when healthy, the starting pitching was suspect, as Rangers starters finished the month with the worst ERA in the Major Leagues.

The injury bug struck the position players as well; All-star third baseman Hank Blalock was moved to the 60-day disabled list after being diagnosed with thoracic outlet syndrome in his right shoulder, a condition that required surgery and a layoff of as much as three months. Outfielders Brad Wilkerson, Frank Catalanotto and Jerry Hairston Jr. also had long stints on the disabled list in May. At month's end, only second baseman Ian Kinsler was among the top three players at his position in All-Star balloting.

June
In stark contrast to May, June was the Rangers' first month of 2007 with a winning record (14–12). Several players had a strong month, most notably outfielder Marlon Byrd, who ended the month with a .375 batting average, and pitcher Kameron Loe, who used a brief stint in Triple-A to correct his pitching mechanics, resulting in a month-ending streak of three straight wins.

Veteran right fielder Sammy Sosa celebrated a career milestone on June 20, hitting his 600th home run in a game against his former team, the Chicago Cubs. Sosa became only the fifth player to reach the mark, following Babe Ruth, Willie Mays, Hank Aaron and Barry Bonds.

While several key players returned to active duty in June, including Wilkerson and Jamey Wright, injuries continued to plague the club. Gold Glove first baseman Mark Teixeira's franchise record for consecutive games played ended at 507 on June 8 when he strained a quadriceps muscle. Starting pitchers Vicente Padilla and Brandon McCarthy also spent time on the DL, for elbow inflammation and blisters, respectively.

July
Before the non-waiver trade deadline, the Rangers' front office headed by general manager Jon Daniels devised a plan to rebuild the Texas Rangers. This change signified a shift away from the practice of signing large numbers of free agents and instead focused on scouting, acquiring, and developing young talent that would be under club control for the first year of the players' careers. Franchise resources would from then on be redistributed with an emphasis on international scouting (particularly in the Far East and Latin America) and minor league development. The organization's stated purpose was to field a team that could legitimately compete for the A.L. Western Division by the 2010 season.

This project began in July 2007 with the trade of 1B Mark Teixeira to the Atlanta Braves, a player the Rangers themselves had drafted and developed themselves. Arguably the biggest trade of the season, Teixeira netted the Rangers organization a treasure trove of young prospects, headlined by Jarrod Saltalamacchia. The Braves also sent over SS Elvis Andrus, RHP Neftalí Feliz, LHP Matt Harrison, and RHP Beau Jones.

The front office subsequently moved closer Éric Gagné to the Boston Red Sox in exchange for RHP Kason Gabbard and OF David Murphy.

These roster moves made the truth apparent to all: the Rangers would not make a concerted effort to win the West in 2007.

August

On August 22, the Rangers scored an all-time American League record of 30 runs in one game against the Orioles. The final was 30–3.  Texas' 30 runs broke the AL record and modern major-league record set by the 1950 Red Sox and tied by the 1955 White Sox, and were the most scored by any team since the Chicago Colts hung 36 runs on Louisville in a game in 1897.

Season standings

Record vs. opponents

Roster

Game log

|- style="background-color:#ffbbbb"
| 1 || April 2 || @ Angels || 4 – 1 || Lackey (1-0) || Millwood (0-1) || Rodríguez (1) || 43,906 || 0-1
|- style="background-color:#ffbbbb"
| 2 || April 3 || @ Angels || 8 – 3 || Escobar (1-0) || Padilla (0-1) || || 42,463 || 0-2
|- style="background-color:#ffbbbb"
| 3 || April 4 || @ Angels || 5 – 3 || Santana (1-0) || McCarthy (0-1) || Rodríguez (2) || 35,701 || 0-3
|- style="background-color:#bbffbb"
| 4 || April 6 || Red Sox || 2 – 0 || Tejeda (1-0) || Wakefield (0-1) || Otsuka (1) || 51,548 || 1-3
|- style="background-color:#bbffbb"
| 5 || April 7 || Red Sox || 8 – 4 || Millwood (1-1) || Tavárez (0-1) || || 40,865 || 2-3
|- style="background-color:#ffbbbb"
| 6 || April 8 || Red Sox || 3 – 2 || Schilling (1-1) || Padilla (0-2) || Papelbon (2) || 28,347 || 2-4
|- style="background-color:#bbffbb"
| 7 || April 9 || Devil Rays || 8 – 4 || McCarthy (1-1) || Jackson (0-1) || || 21,547 || 3-4
|- style="background-color:#bbffbb"
| 8 || April 10 || Devil Rays || 12 – 9 || Feldman (1-0) || Seo (0-1) || || 23,897 || 4-4
|- style="background-color:#ffbbbb"
| 9 || April 11 || Devil Rays || 6 – 5 || Shields (1-0) || Tejeda (1-1) || || 33,674 || 4-5
|- style="background-color:#bbffbb"
| 10 || April 13 || @ Mariners || 5 – 2 || Millwood (2-1) || Washburn (0-1) || Gagné (1) || 25,243 || 5-5
|- style="background-color:#ffbbbb"
| 11 || April 14 || @ Mariners || 8 – 3 || Batista (1-1) || Padilla (0-3) || || 25,954 || 5-6
|- style="background-color:#ffbbbb"
| 12 || April 15 || @ Mariners || 14 – 6 || Ramírez (1-0) || McCarthy (1-2) || || 25,001 || 5-7
|- style="background-color:#bbffbb"
| 13 || April 17 || @ White Sox || 8 – 1 || Tejeda (2-1) || Garland (0-1) || || 23,139 || 6-7
|- style="background-color:#ffbbbb"
| 14 || April 18 || @ White Sox || 6 – 0 || Buehrle (1-0) || Millwood (2-2) || || 25,390 || 6-8
|- style="background-color:#ffbbbb"
| 15 || April 19 || @ White Sox || 6 – 4 || Thornton (1-1) || Feldman (1-1) || Jenks (4) || 25,459 || 6-9
|- style="background-color:#ffbbbb"
| 16 || April 20 || Athletics || 16 – 4 || Blanton (2-0) || McCarthy (1-3) || || 29,782 || 6-10
|- style="background-color:#bbffbb"
| 17 || April 21 || Athletics || 7 – 0 || Loe (1-0) || Kennedy (0-2) || || 42,945 || 7-10
|- style="background-color:#bbffbb"
| 18 || April 22 || Athletics || 4 – 3 || Eyre (1-0) || Duchscherer (1-1) || Otsuka (2) || 37,002 || 8-10
|- style="background-color:#ffbbbb"
| 19 || April 23 ||Mariners || 5 – 4 || Morrow (1-0) || Millwood (2-3) || Putz (1) || 26,592 || 8-11
|- style="background-color:#bbbbbb"
| -- || April 24 || Mariners || colspan=5|Postponed (rain)  || 8-11
|- style="background-color:#ffbbbb"
| 20 || April 25 || @ Indians || 8 – 7  || Cabrera (1-0) || Eyre (1-1) || || 13,843 || 8-12
|- style="background-color:#ffbbbb"
| 21 || April 26 || @ Indians || 9 – 4 || Byrd (2-1) || Loe (1-1) || || 14,066 || 8-13
|- style="background-color:#bbffbb"
| 22 || April 27 || @ Blue Jays || 5 – 3 || Tejeda (3-1) || Towers (1-3) || Otsuka (3) || 24,795 || 9-13
|- style="background-color:#bbffbb"
| 23 || April 28 || @ Blue Jays || 9 – 8  || Otsuka (1-0) || Tallet (0-1) || Benoit (1) || 24,119 || 10-13
|- style="background-color:#ffbbbb"
| 24 || April 29 || @ Blue Jays || 7 – 3 || Ohka (2-2) || McCarthy (1-4) || || 27,516 || 10-14
|- style="background-color:#ffbbbb"
| 25 || April 30 || @ Blue Jays || 6 – 1 || Halladay (4-0) || Padilla (0-4) || || 19,041 || 10-15

|- style="background-color:#ffbbbb"
| 26 || May 1 || Yankees || 10 – 1 || Hughes (1-1) ||Loe (1-2) || || 32,310 || 10-16
|- style="background-color:#bbbbbb"
| -- || May 2 || Yankees || colspan=5 | Postponed (rain)  || 10-16
|- style="background-color:#ffbbbb"
| 27 || May 3 || Yankees || 4 – 3 || Vizcaíno (2-1) || Benoit (0-1) || Rivera (2) || n/a || 10-17
|- style="background-color:#ffbbbb"
| 28 || May 3 || Yankees || 5 – 2 || Mussina (1-1) || Tejeda (3-2) || Rivera (3) || 40,671 || 10-18
|- style="background-color:#bbffbb"
| 29 || May 4 || Blue Jays || 7 – 1 || McCarthy (2-4) || Ohka (2-3) || Eyre (1) || 24,342 || 11-18
|- style="background-color:#bbffbb"
| 30 || May 5 || Blue Jays || 11 – 4 || Padilla (1-4) || Halladay (4-1)|| || 27,421 || 12-18
|- style="background-color:#bbffbb"
| 31 || May 6 || Blue Jays || 3 – 2 || Benoit (1-1) || Burnett (2-3) || Otsuka (4) || 19,103 || 13-18
|- style="background-color:#ffbbbb"
| 32 || May 8 || @ Yankees || 8 – 2 || Pettitte (2-1) || Wood (0-1) || || 50,705 || 13-19
|- style="background-color:#ffbbbb"
| 33 || May 9 || @ Yankees || 6 – 2 || Mussina (2-1) || Tejeda (3-3) || || 47,930 || 13-20
|- style="background-color:#bbffbb"
| 34 || May 10 || @ Yankees || 14 – 2 || McCarthy (3-4) || Wang (1-3) || || 52,147 || 14-20
|- style="background-color:#ffbbbb"
| 35 || May 11 || Angels || 6 – 3 || Lackey (5-3) || Padilla (1-5) || Shields (3) || 30,782 || 14-21
|- style="background-color:#ffbbbb"
| 36 || May 12 || Angels || 6 – 3 || Colón (4-0) || Loe (1-3) || Rodríguez (12) || 36,474 || 14-22
|- style="background-color:#bbffbb"
| 37 || May 13 || Angels || 7 – 6 || Gagné (1-0) || Shields (0-2) || || 24,847 || 15-22
|- style="background-color:#ffbbbb"
| 38 || May 14 || Angels || 7 – 2 || Weaver (2-3) || Millwood (2-4) || || 23,421 || 15-23
|- style="background-color:#ffbbbb"
| 39 || May 15 || @ Devil Rays* || 4 – 3  || Stokes (2-5) || Feldman (1-2) || || 8,443 || 15-24
|- style="background-color:#ffbbbb"
| 40 || May 16 || @ Devil Rays* || 11 – 8 || Fossum (3-3) || Padilla (1-6) || Reyes (12) || 8,839 || 15-25
|- style="background-color:#ffbbbb"
| 41 || May 17 || @ Devil Rays* || 8 – 6  || Glover (1-2) || Eyre (1-2) || || 9,635 || 15-26
|- style="background-color:#bbffbb"
| 42 || May 18 || @ Astros || 7 – 4 || Tejeda (4-3) || Albers (1-3) || Gagné (2) || 37,634 || 16-26
|- style="background-color:#ffbbbb"
| 43 || May 19 || @ Astros || 6 – 1 || Rodríguez (2-3) || Koronka (0-1) || || 41,990 || 16-27
|- style="background-color:#bbffbb"
| 44 || May 20 || @ Astros || 14 – 1 || McCarthy (4-4)  || Williams (1-6) || || 39,938 || 17-27
|- style="background-color:#bbffbb"
| 45 || May 21 || Twins || 14 – 4 || Padilla (2-6) || Silva (2-5) || || 24,814 || 18-27
|- style="background-color:#ffbbbb"
| 46 || May 22 || Twins || 7 – 1 || Santana (5-4) || Loe (1-4) || || 27,013 || 18-28
|- style="background-color:#ffbbbb"
| 47 || May 23 || Twins || 5 – 3 || Bonser (3-1) || Tejeda (4-4) || Nathan (9) || 24,370 || 18-29
|- style="background-color:#ffbbbb"
| 48 || May 25 || Red Sox || 10 – 6 || Matsuzaka (7-2) || Littleton (0-1) || || 33,552 || 18-30
|- style="background-color:#ffbbbb"
| 49 || May 26 || Red Sox || 7 – 4 || Wakefield (5-5) || Padilla (2-7) || Papelbon (12) || 37,974 || 18-31
|- style="background-color:#ffbbbb"
| 50 || May 27 || Red Sox || 6 – 5 || Piñeiro (1-0) || Otsuka (1-1) || Okajima (3) || 40,323 || 18-32
|- style="background-color:#ffbbbb"
| 51 || May 28 || @ Athletics || 5 – 3 || Gaudin (5-1) || Tejeda (4-5)|| Embree (3) || 18,230 || 18-33
|- style="background-color:#bbffbb"
| 52 || May 29 || @ Athletics || 4 – 0 || Wood (1-1) || DiNardo (1-2) || Gagné (3) || 18,006 || 19-33
|- style="background-color:#ffbbbb"
| 53 || May 30 || @ Athletics || 6 – 1 || Haren (6-2) || Koronka (0-2) || || 25,674 || 19-34
|- style="background-color:#ffbbbb"
| 54 || May 31 || @ Mariners || 9 – 5 || Baek (3-2) || Padilla (2-8) || || 20,137 || 19-35
|-
| colspan=8 | *At Walt Disney World in Orlando, Florida

|- style="background-color:#bbffbb"
| 55 || June 1 || @ Mariners || 9 – 8 || Benoit (2-1) || Green (0-1) || Gagné (4) || 34,570 || 20-35
|- style="background-color:#ffbbbb"
| 56 || June 2 || @ Mariners || 5 – 4 || Batista (6-4) || Loe (1-5) || Putz (13) || 41,988 || 20-36
|- style="background-color:#ffbbbb"
| 57 || June 3 || @ Mariners || 11 – 6 || Feierabend (1-1) || Tejeda (4-6) || || 36,886 || 20-37
|- style="background-color:#bbffbb"
| 58 || June 5 || Tigers || 7 – 4 || Eyre (2-2) || Robertson (4-6) || Gagné (5) || 32,003 || 21-37
|- style="background-color:#ffbbbb"
| 59 || June 6 || Tigers || 10 – 0 || Verlander (6-2) || Millwood (2-5) || || 28,795 || 21-38
|- style="background-color:#ffbbbb"
| 60 || June 7 || Tigers || 11 – 4 || Maroth (4-2) || Loe (1-6) || || 22,990 || 21-39
|- style="background-color:#bbffbb"
| 61 || June 8 || Brewers || 9 – 6 || Tejeda (5-6) || Capuano (5-5) || Gagné (6) || 29,562 || 22-39
|- style="background-color:#bbffbb"
| 62 || June 9 || Brewers || 4 – 3 || Francisco (1-0) || Cordero (0-1) || || 37,882 || 23-39
|- style="background-color:#ffbbbb"
| 63 || June 10 || Brewers || 9 – 6  || Villanueva (5-0) || Eyre (2-3) || Vargas (1) || 24,129 || 23-40
|- style="background-color:#ffbbbb"
| 64 || June 12 || @ Pirates || 7 – 5 || Duke (3-6) || Millwood (2-6) || Capps (3) || 21,158 || 23-41
|- style="background-color:#ffbbbb"
| 65 || June 13 || @ Pirates || 8 – 1 || Snell (6-4) || Tejeda (5-7) || || 16,110 || 23-42
|- style="background-color:#bbffbb"
| 66 || June 14 || @ Pirates || 6 – 0 || Loe (2-6) || Gorzelanny (6-4) || || 17,214 || 24-42
|- style="background-color:#bbffbb"
| 67 || June 15 || @ Reds || 7 – 6 || Padilla (3-8) || Belisle (5-5) || Gagné (7) || 27,747 || 25-42
|- style="background-color:#ffbbbb"
| 68 || June 16 || @ Reds || 8 – 4 || Harang (7-2) || Wright (0-1) || || 37,413 || 25-43
|- style="background-color:#bbffbb"
| 69 || June 17 || @ Reds || 11 – 4 || Millwood (3-6) || Arroyo (2-8) || || 31,162 || 26-43
|- style="background-color:#ffbbbb"
| 70 || June 19 || Cubs || 5 – 4 || Mármol (2-0) || Benoit (2-2) || || 38,290 || 26-44
|- style="background-color:#bbffbb"
| 71 || June 20 || Cubs || 7 – 3 || Loe (3-6) || Marquis (5-4) || ||  37,564 || 27-44
|- style="background-color:#bbffbb"
| 72 || June 21 || Cubs || 6 – 5 || Gagné (2-0) || Howry (3-4) || || 38,406 || 28-44
|- style="background-color:#bbffbb"
| 73 || June 22 || Astros || 11 – 3 || Millwood (4-6) || Williams (3-10) || || 37,847 || 29-44
|- style="background-color:#bbffbb"
| 74 || June 23 || Astros || 7 – 2 || Wright (1-1) || Oswalt (7-5) || || 42,315 || 30-44
|- style="background-color:#ffbbbb"
| 75 || June 24 || Astros || 12 – 9  || Wheeler (1-4) || Wilson (0-1) || Qualls (2) || 31,560 || 30-45
|- style="background-color:#bbffbb"
| 76 || June 25 || @ Tigers || 8 – 3 || Loe (4-6) || Bonderman (8-1) || || 36,330 ||  31-45
|- style="background-color:#bbffbb"
| 77 || June 26 || @ Tigers || 9 – 6 || Otsuka (2-1) || Jones (1-4) || Gagné (8) || 39,709 || 32-45
|- style="background-color:#bbbbbb"
| -- || June 27 || @ Tigers || colspan=5|Postponed (rain)  || 32-45
|- style="background-color:#ffbbbb"
| 78 || June 28 || @ Tigers || 5 – 2 || Rogers (2-0)|| Millwood (4-7) || Jones (19) || 37,253 || 32-46
|- style="background-color:#ffbbbb"
| 79 || June 29 || @ Red Sox || 2 – 1 || Wakefield (8-8) || Wright (1-2) || Papelbon (19) || 36,756 || 32-47
|- style="background-color:#bbffbb"
| 80 || June 30 || @ Red Sox || 5 – 4 || Mahay (1-0) || Beckett (11-2) || Gagné (9) || 36,747 || 33-47

|- style="background-color:#bbffbb"
| 81 || July 1 || @ Red Sox || 2 – 1 || Loe (5-6) || Tavárez (5-6) || Gagné (10) || 36,378 || 34-47
|- style="background-color:#ffbbbb"
| 82 || July 2 || @ Red Sox || 7 – 3 || Gabbard (2-0) || McCarthy (4-5) || || 36,778 || 34-48
|- style="background-color:#bbffbb"
| 83 || July 3 || Angels || 8 – 3 || Millwood (5-7) || Santana (5-9) || || 24,871 || 35-48
|- style="background-color:#bbffbb"
| 84 || July 4 || Angels || 4 – 2 || Wright (2-2) || Weaver (6-5) || Gagné (11) || 46,105 || 36-48
|- style="background-color:#ffbbbb"
| 85 || July 5 || Angels || 5 – 2 || Escobar (10-3) || Tejeda (5-8) || || 22,062 || 36-49
|- style="background-color:#bbffbb"
| 86 || July 6 || Orioles || 4 – 3  || Benoit (3-2) || Shuey (0-1) || || 24,035 || 37-49
|- style="background-color:#ffbbbb"
| 87 || July 7 || Orioles || 3 – 0 || Bédard (7-4) || McCarthy (4-6) || || 32,849 || 37-50
|- style="background-color:#bbffbb"
| 88 || July 8 || Orioles || 2 – 1 || Millwood (6-7) || Cabrera  (6-10) || Gagné (12) || 22,843 || 38-50
|- style="background-color:#ffbbbb"
| 89 || July 13 || @ Angels || 2 – 1 || Rodríguez (3-2) || Benoit (3-3) || || 44,100 || 38-51
|- style="background-color:#ffbbbb"
| 90 || July 14 || @ Angels || 9 – 5 || Lackey (12-5) || Loe (5-7) || || 44,026 || 38-52
|- style="background-color:#bbffbb"
| 91 || July 15 || @ Angels || 5 – 4  || Wilson (1-1) || Speier (0-1) || Gagné (13) || 44,068 || 39-52
|- style="background-color:#bbffbb"
| 92 || July 16 || @ Athletics || 4 – 1 || Wright (3-2) || Braden (1-4) ||Gagné (14) || 18,160 || 40-52
|- style="background-color:#bbffbb"
| 93 || July 17 || @ Athletics || 11 – 4 || Eyre (3-3) || Gaudin (8-5) || Mahay (1) || 20,209 || 41-52
|- style="background-color:#ffbbbb"
| 94 || July 18 || @ Athletics || 6 – 0 || DiNardo (4-6) || Millwood (6-8) || || 23,440 || 41-53
|- style="background-color:#ffbbbb"
| 95 || July 19 || Indians || 7 – 5 || Sabathia (13-4) || Loe (5-8) || Borowski (27) || 28,108 || 41-54
|- style="background-color:#ffbbbb"
| 96 || July 20 || Indians || 3 – 2 || Carmona (12-4) || McCarthy (4-7) || Borowski (28) || 32,103 || 41-55
|- style="background-color:#bbffbb"
| 97 || July 21 || Indians || 8 – 5 || Mahay (2-0) || Lee (5-7) || || 44,554 || 42-55
|- style="background-color:#ffbbbb"
| 98 || July 22 || Indians || 8 – 3 || Byrd (8-4) || Tejeda (5-9) || || 27,227 || 42-56
|- style="background-color:#bbffbb"
| 99 || July 23 || Mariners || 8 – 7 || Millwood (7-8) || Ramírez (5-3) || || 20,584 || 43-56
|- style="background-color:#bbffbb"
| 100 || July 24 || Mariners || 2 – 1 || Rheinecker (1-0) || Feierabend (1-4) || Gagné (15) || n/a || 44-56
|- style="background-color:#bbffbb"
| 101 || July 24 || Mariners || 4 – 3 || Wilson (2-1) || Reitsma (0-2) || Gagné (16) || 26,842 || 45-56
|- style="background-color:#bbffbb"
| 102 || July 25 || Mariners || 7 – 6 || Benoit (4-3) || Putz (1-1)|| || 34,853 || 46-56
|- style="background-color:#ffbbbb"
| 103 || July 27 || @ Royals || 6 – 1 || Bannister (7-6) || Wright (3-3) || || 21,730 || 46-57
|- style="background-color:#ffbbbb"
| 104 || July 28 || @ Royals || 6 – 5 || Pérez (6-9) || Millwood (7-9) || Dotel (11) || 27,700 || 46-58
|- style="background-color:#ffbbbb"
| 105 || July 29 || @ Royals || 10 – 0 || Núñez (1-0) || Loe (5-9) || Peralta (1) || 15,638 || 46-59
|- style="background-color:#bbffbb"
| 106 || July 31 || @ Indians || 3 – 1|| McCarthy (5-7)|| Carmona (13-5) || Wilson (1) || 21,811 || 47-59

|- style="background-color:#bbffbb"
| 107 || August 1 || @ Indians || 9 – 6  || Benoit (5-3) || Lewis (0-1) || Wilson (2) || 25,721 || 48-59
|- style="background-color:#ffbbbb"
| 108 || August 2 || @ Indians || 5 – 0 || Westbrook (2-6) || Gabbard (4-1) || || 27,520 || 48-60
|- style="background-color:#ffbbbb"
| 109 || August 3 || @ Blue Jays || 6 – 4 || Halladay (12-5) || Wright (3-4) || Accardo (19) || 23,777 || 48-61
|- style="background-color:#ffbbbb"
| 110 || August 4 || @ Blue Jays || 9 – 5 || Marcum (8-4) || Eyre (3-4) || || 25,321 || 48-62
|- style="background-color:#ffbbbb"
| 111 || August 5 || @ Blue Jays || 4 – 1 || McGowan (8-5) || McCarthy (5-8) || Accardo (20) || 29,593 || 48-63
|- style="background-color:#ffbbbb"
| 112 || August 6 || Athletics || 9 – 7  || Brown (2-0) || Eyre (3-5) || Calero (1) || 24,737 || 48-64
|- style="background-color:#bbffbb"
| 113 || August 7 || Athletics || 8 – 6 || Gabbard (5-1) || Gaudin (8-8) || Wilson (3) || 25,122 || 49-64
|- style="background-color:#ffbbbb"
| 114 || August 8 || Athletics || 6 – 3 || DiNardo (6-6) || Murray (0-1) || Embree (14) || 29,647 || 49-65
|- style="background-color:#bbffbb"
| 115 || August 10 || Devil Rays || 7 – 4 || Wood (2-1) || Sonnanstine (1-8) || Wilson (4) || 28,314 || 50-65
|- style="background-color:#ffbbbb"
| 116 || August 11 || Devil Rays || 3 – 0 || Jackson (3-11) || Rheinecker (1-1)  || || 36,709 || 50-66
|- style="background-color:#bbffbb"
| 117 || August 12 || Devil Rays || 9 – 1 || Eyre (4-5) || Hammel (1-2) || || 24,042 || 51-66
|- style="background-color:#bbffbb"
| 118 || August 14 || Royals || 5 – 3 || Millwood (8-9) || Davies (1-1) || Wilson (5) || 23,906 || 52-66
|- style="background-color:#bbffbb"
| 119 || August 15 || Royals || 4 – 3 || Wood (3-1) || Meche (7-11) || Wilson (6) || 24,529 || 53-66
|- style="background-color:#ffbbbb"
| 120 || August 16 || Royals || 6 – 2 || Braun (1-0) || Eyre (4-6) || || 22,674 || 53-67
|- style="background-color:#ffbbbb"
| 121 || August 17 || @ Twins || 2 – 1  || Guerrier (2-4) || Wright (3-5) || || 30,924 || 53-68
|- style="background-color:#bbffbb"
| 122 || August 18 || @ Twins || 5 – 0 || Loe (6-9) || Bonser (5-10) || || 41,037 || 54-68
|- style="background-color:#ffbbbb"
| 123 || August 19 || @ Twins || 1 – 0 || Santana (13-9) || Millwood (8-10) || Nathan (27) || 36,353 || 54-69
|- style="background-color:#bbbbbb"
| -- || August 20 || @ Orioles || colspan=5|Postponed (rain)  || 54-69
|- style="background-color:#ffbbbb"
| 124 || August 21 || @ Orioles || 6 – 2 || Bédard (13-4) || Padilla (3-9) || || 18,926 || 54-70
|- style="background-color:#bbffbb"
| 125 || August 22 || @ Orioles || 30 – 3 || Gabbard (6-1) || Cabrera (9-13) || Littleton (1) || 21,828 || 55-70
|- style="background-color:#bbffbb"
| 126 || August 22 || @ Orioles || 9 – 7 || Benoit (6-3) || Hoey (1-1) || Wilson (7) || 21,828 || 56-70
|- style="background-color:#ffbbbb"
| 127 || August 23 || Mariners || 9 – 4 || Weaver (6-10) || Loe (6-10) || || 26,963 || 56-71
|- style="background-color:#ffbbbb"
| 128 || August 24 || Mariners || 4 – 2 || Hernández (10-6) || Millwood (8-11) || Putz (37) || 32,716 || 56-72
|- style="background-color:#bbffbb"
| 129 || August 25 || Mariners || 5 – 3 || Benoit (7-3) || White (1-1) || Wilson (8) || 47,977 || 57-72
|- style="background-color:#bbffbb"
| 130 || August 26 || Mariners || 5 – 3 || Padilla (4-9) || Washburn (9-11) || || 25,437 || 58-72
|- style="background-color:#bbffbb"
| 131 || August 28 || White Sox || 4 – 3 || Littleton (1-1) || MacDougal (1-4) || Benoit (2) || 20,261 || 59-72
|- style="background-color:#bbffbb"
| 132 || August 29 || White Sox || 5 – 4  || Littleton (2-1) || Logan (2-1) || || 23,704 || 60-72
|- style="background-color:#bbffbb"
| 133 || August 30 || White Sox || 5 – 1 || Millwood (9-11) || Danks (6-13) || || 23,432 || 61-72
|- style="background-color:#ffbbbb"
| 134 || August 31 || @ Angels || 7 – 6  || Oliver (2-0) || Francisco (1-1) || || 41,012 || 61-73

|- style="background-color:#bbffbb"
| 135 || September 1 || @ Angels || 7 – 6 || Vólquez (1-0) || Escobar (15-7) || Wilson (9) || 38,342 || 62-73
|- style="background-color:#bbffbb"
| 136 || September 2 || @ Angels || 8 – 7 || Littleton (3-1) || Shields (3-5) || Wilson (10) || 40,635 || 63-73
|- style="background-color:#ffbbbb"
| 137 || September 3 || Royals || 8 – 1 || Greinke (6-5) || Loe (6-11) || || 19,214 || 63-74
|- style="background-color:#bbffbb"
| 138 || September 4 || Royals || 9 – 8 || Rheinecker (2-1) || Núñez (2-3) || Wilson (11) || 18,892 || 64-74
|- style="background-color:#bbffbb"
| 139 || September 5 || Royals || 3 – 2 || Padilla (5-9) || Davies (6-12) || Benoit (3) || 17,232 || 65-74
|- style="background-color:#bbffbb"
| 140 || September 7 || Athletics || 5 – 3 || Vólquez (2-0) || Haren (14-7) || Benoit (4) || 22,318 || 66-74
|- style="background-color:#bbffbb"
| 141 || September 8 || Athletics || 7 – 3 || Murray (1-1) || Gaudin (11-10) || || 32,476 || 67-74
|- style="background-color:#bbffbb"
| 142 || September 9 || Athletics || 12 – 9 || White (1-0) || DiNardo (8-9) || || 25,054 || 68-74
|- style="background-color:#bbffbb"
| 143 || September 11 || @ Tigers || 13 – 6 || Padilla (6-9) ||  Durbin (8-7) || || 32,719 || 69-74
|- style="background-color:#ffbbbb"
| 144 || September 11 || @ Tigers || 4 – 1 || Jurrjens (2-1) || McCarthy (5-9) || Jones (34) || 33,840 || 69-75
|- style="background-color:#ffbbbb"
| 145 || September 12 || @ Tigers || 5 – 1 || Verlander (17-5) || Vólquez (2-1) ||  || 32,490 || 69-76
|- style="background-color:#ffbbbb"
| 146 || September 13 || @ Athletics || 6 – 5 || Gaudin (11-11) || Millwood (9-12) || Street (15) || 16,240 || 69-77
|- style="background-color:#ffbbbb"
| 147 || September 14 || @ Athletics || 11 – 9 || Brown (3-2) || Rheinecker (2-2) || Street (16) || 19,346 || 69-78
|- style="background-color:#ffbbbb"
| 148 || September 15 || @ Athletics || 7 – 3 || Blanton (14-9) || McCarthy (5-10) || Embree (17) || 24,517 || 69-79
|- style="background-color:#bbffbb"
| 149 || September 16 || @ Athletics || 11 – 9 || Rheinecker (3-2) || Brown (3-3) || Benoit (5) || 23,770 || 70-79
|- style="background-color:#ffbbbb"
| 150 || September 17 || @ Twins || 5 – 4 || Nathan (4-2) || Benoit (7-4) || || 14,197 || 70-80
|- style="background-color:#ffbbbb"
| 151 || September 18 || @ Twins || 4 – 2 || Silva (12-14) || Millwood (9-13) || Nathan (33) || 18,226 || 70-81
|- style="background-color:#ffbbbb"
| 152 || September 19 || @ Twins || 4 – 2 || Garza (4-6) || Padilla (6-10) || Nathan (34) || 17,842 || 70-82
|- style="background-color:#ffbbbb"
| 153 || September 20 || Orioles || 6 – 3 || Walker (2-2) || Rheinecker (3-3) || || 20,136 || 70-83
|- style="background-color:#bbffbb"
| 154 || September 21 || Orioles || 3 – 2 || Mendoza (1-0) || Santos (1-6) || Benoit (6) || 30,603 || 71-83
|- style="background-color:#ffbbbb"
| 155 || September 22 || Orioles || 11 – 9 || Hoey (2-4) || Littleton (3-2) || Walker (6) || 40,148 || 71-84
|- style="background-color:#bbffbb"
| 156 || September 23 || Orioles || 3 – 0 || Millwood (10-13) || Leicester (2-3) || Wilson (12) || 37,812 || 72-84
|- style="background-color:#bbffbb"
| 157 || September 24 || Angels || 8 – 7 || White (2-0) || Santana (7-14) || Littleton (2) || 22,881 || 73-84
|- style="background-color:#bbffbb"
| 158 || September 25 || Angels || 3 – 1 || Wright (4-5) || Oliver (3-1) || || 30,708 || 74-84
|- style="background-color:#bbffbb"
| 159 || September 26 || Angels || 16 – 2 || Rheinecker (4-3) || Saunders (8-4) || || 24,223 || 75-84
|- style="background-color:#ffbbbb"
| 160 || September 28 || @ Mariners || 6 – 4 || Putz (6-1) || Wood (3-2) || || 31,954 || 75-85
|- style="background-color:#ffbbbb"
| 161 || September 29 || @ Mariners || 5 – 1 || Batista (16-11) || Millwood (10-14) || || 26,799 || 75-86
|- style="background-color:#ffbbbb"
| 162 || September 30 || @ Mariners || 4 – 2 || Hernández (14-7) || Murray (1-2) || Putz (40) || 30,442 || 75-87

|-
| Source: ESPN

Player stats

Batting

Starters by position
Note: G = Games played; AB = At bats; H = Hits; Avg. = Batting average; HR = Home runs; RBI = Runs batted in

Other batters
Note: G = Games played; AB = At bats; H = Hits; Avg. = Batting average; HR = Home runs; RBI = Runs batted in

Pitching

Starting pitchers 
Note: G = Games pitched; IP = Innings pitched; W = Wins; L = Losses; ERA = Earned run average; SO = Strikeouts

Other pitchers 
Note: G = Games pitched; IP = Innings pitched; W = Wins; L = Losses; ERA = Earned run average; SO = Strikeouts

Relief pitchers 
Note: G = Games pitched; W = Wins; L = Losses; SV = Saves; ERA = Earned run average; SO = Strikeouts

Farm system

References

1st Half: Texas Rangers Game Log on ESPN.com
2nd Half: Texas Rangers Game Log on ESPN.com
Batting Statistics: Texas Rangers Batting Stats on ESPN.com
Pitching Statistics: Texas Rangers Pitching Stats on ESPN.com
2007 Texas Rangers at Baseball Reference

Texas Rangers seasons
Texas Rangers season
Range